Nicolás Alfredo Trotta (born 20 January 1976) is an Argentine politician. He was Argentina's Minister of Education from 10 December 2019 to 20 September 2021, in the cabinet of President Alberto Fernández.

From 2014 to 2019, he was rector of the Metropolitan University for Education and Labour (UMET), the private university of the Doorkeepers' Union (SUTERH). Before that, from 2007 to 2009, he was Undersecretary of Administrative Technologies, reporting directly to the Chief of the Cabinet of Ministers – first Alberto Fernández, then Sergio Massa, and finally Aníbal Fernández. He was also briefly director of YPF, Argentina's main oil and gas company.

Early life and education
Nicolás Alfredo Trotta was born on 20 January 1976 in Buenos Aires. He studied law at the University of Belgrano and is yet to present his dissertation for a master's degree on education from the University of Buenos Aires's Faculty of Philosophy and Letters.

Political career
Trotta's political career began in the New Leadership party, founded by Gustavo Béliz. Trotta worked as an advisor in the New Leadership parliamentary group at the Buenos Aires City Legislature from 1997 to 2000. He had run for a seat in the City Legislature in the New Leadership list alongside, among others, Alberto Fernández, but failed to be elected. In 2000 he was appointed director of the parliamentary commission on economic development, Mercosur affairs and employment policy.  

Early into the presidency of Néstor Kirchner, for whom Fernández served as Chief of the Cabinet of Ministers, Trotta became the coordinator of the youth organization Jóvenes K. In 2004, Trotta was appointed director of the National School of Governance, which operated during Kirchner's presidency.

From 2007 to 2009 he was Undersecretary of Administrative Technologies, reporting directly to the Chief of Cabinet; he served under Alberto Fernández, Sergio Massa and Aníbal Fernández. He was succeeded in the position by Eduardo Thill. In 2014, he became rector of the Metropolitan University of Education and Labour (UMET), the private university of the Doorkeepers' Union (SUTERH) headed by Buenos Aires City Justicialist Party president Víctor Santa María. As rector of the UMET, he co-founded the Workers' Innovation Centre (CITRA), co-sponsored by the CONICET.

For six months from 2015 to 2016 he was director of Yacimientos Petrolíferos Fiscales, Argentina's main energy company.

Minister of Education
On 6 December 2019, President-elect Alberto Fernández announced he would be appointing Trotta to lead the Ministry of Education, succeeding Alejandro Finocchiaro. He took office on 10 December 2019, alongside the rest of the cabinet. He was replaced with Jaime Perczyk on 20 September 2021 as part of a cabinet reshuffle, following the government's poor showings in the 2021 legislative primary elections.

References

External links

trottanico on Twitter
Official website of the Ministry of Education (in Spanish)

|-

1976 births
Living people
Politicians from Buenos Aires
Argentine ministers of education
University of Buenos Aires alumni
21st-century Argentine politicians